Burlington is a city in and the county seat of Coffey County, Kansas, United States.  As of the 2020 census, the population of the city was 2,634.

History

Burlington was founded in 1857. It was named after Burlington, Vermont, the native home of one of its founders.

The first post office in Burlington was established in 1858, when it was removed from the now extinct town of Hampden.

The population increased significantly as Wolf Creek Generating Station was constructed from 1977 to 1985.

Geography
Burlington is located at  (38.194420, -95.745532).

Climate
The climate in this area is characterized by hot, humid summers and generally mild to cool winters.  According to the Köppen Climate Classification system, Burlington has a humid subtropical climate, abbreviated "Cfa" on climate maps.

Demographics

2010 census
As of the census of 2010, there were 2,674 people, 1,138 households, and 699 families living in the city. The racial makeup of the city was 94.7% White, 1.0% African American, 1.0% Native American, 0.9% Asian, 0.7% from other races, and 1.7% from two or more races. Hispanic or Latino of any race were 2.5% of the population.

There were 1,138 households, of which 30.8% had children under the age of 18 living with them, 45.7% were married couples living together, 12.2% had a female householder with no husband present, 3.5% had a male householder with no wife present, and 38.6% were non-families. 33.7% of all households were made up of individuals, and 14.1% had someone living alone who was 65 years of age or older. The average household size was 2.27 and the average family size was 2.88.

The median age in the city was 41.1 years. 24.6% of residents were under the age of 18; 6.9% were between the ages of 18 and 24; 22.8% were from 25 to 44; 27.2% were from 45 to 64; and 18.3% were 65 years of age or older. The gender makeup of the city was 47.4% male and 52.6% female.

2000 census
As of the census of 2000, there were 2,790 people, 1,122 households, and 713 families living in the city. The racial makeup of the city was 95.95% White, 0.32% Black or African American, 0.57% Native American, 0.68% Asian, 0.61% from other races, and 1.86% from two or more races. 1.79% of the population were Hispanic or Latino of any race.

There were 1,122 households, out of which 33.1% had children under the age of 18 living with them, 50.7% were married couples living together, 10.1% had a female householder with no husband present, and 36.4% were non-families. 33.1% of all households were made up of individuals, and 16.1% had someone living alone who was 65 years of age or older. The average household size was 2.38 and the average family size was 3.02.

In the city, the population was spread out, with 26.0% under the age of 18, 8.4% from 18 to 24, 27.5% from 25 to 44, 20.3% from 45 to 64, and 17.8% who were 65 years of age or older. The median age was 38 years. For every 100 females, there were 87.6 males. For every 100 females age 18 and over, there were 84.1 males.

The median income for a household in the city was $36,174, and the median income for a family was $43,021. Males had a median income of $30,946 versus $20,357 for females. The per capita income for the city was $18,443. About 5.2% of families and 7.6% of the population were below the poverty line, including 7.2% of those under age 18 and 9.8% of those age 65 or over.

Economy

Wolf Creek
Located just northeast of Burlington is the Wolf Creek Generating Station, the only nuclear power plant in Kansas. This plant is situated on Coffey County Lake, which was constructed as the cooling lake for the plant.  The plant has been generating electricity since 1985, and is a local landmark.  Wolf Creek Nuclear Operating Corporation ("WCNOC") operates the plant, and is a subsidiary of the plant's owners Kansas Gas & Electric (part of Westar Energy), Kansas City Power & Light (part of Great Plains Energy), and KEPCO (an association of Kansas electric power cooperatives). Westar and Great Plains Energy merged in 2018 to form Evergy, while maintaining the Westar and KCP&L names until October of 2019.

Education
The community is served by Burlington USD 244 public school district, and has three schools: Burlington High School, Burlington Middle School, Burlington Elementary School.

Allen County Community College offers classes at Burlington High School, both for adults and for high school students who may earn concurrent credits.

Burlington is home to the Burlington Carnegie Free Library, although the building no longer houses a library and is now used as an office space.  The Burlington branch of the Coffey County Library meets the community's information needs.

Notable people
 Christian Braun – college basketball player for University of Kansas and the Denver Nuggets
 Harrison Kelley (1836–1897) – U.S. Representative from Kansas
 Tyrel Reed – former professional basketball player; former college basketball player for University of Kansas; winningest player in KU Jayhawks history

See also
 John Redmond Reservoir
 Great Flood of 1951

References

Further reading

External links

 City of Burlington
 Burlington – Directory of Public Officials
 Burlington city map, KDOT

Cities in Kansas
County seats in Kansas
Cities in Coffey County, Kansas
1857 establishments in Kansas Territory